Gossypium arboreum, commonly called tree cotton, is a species of cotton native to India, Pakistan and Bangladesh and other tropical and subtropical regions of the Old World.  There is evidence of its cultivation as long ago as the Harappan civilization of the Indus Valley for the production of cotton textiles. The shrub was included in Linnaeus's Species Plantarum published in 1753. The holotype was also supplied by him, which is now in the Linnean Herbarium in the Swedish Museum of Natural History.

Description
Tree cotton is a shrub attaining heights of one to two metres. Its branches are covered with pubescence and are purple in colour. Stipules are  present at the leaf base and they are linear to lanceolate in shape and sometimes falcate (i.e. sickle-shaped). The leaves are attached to the stem by a 1.5 to 10 cm petiole. The blades are ovate to orbicular in shape and have five to seven lobes, making them superficially resemble a maple leaf. The lobes are linear to lanceolate, and often a tooth is present in the sinus. Glands are present along the midrib or occasionally on the adjacent nerves. The leaves are glabrescent, meaning the pubescence is lost with age, but when it is present on young leaves, it is both stellate (i.e. star-shaped) and simple.

The flowers are set on short pedicels (i.e. flower stalks). An epicalyx is present, which is a series of subtending bracts that resemble sepals. Its large, ovate segments are dentate (i.e. toothed along the margins), though sometimes only very slightly so. They are cordate (i.e. heart-shaped) at the base and acute at the apex. Its shape is cupular, and five subtle dentations are present. The corolla is a pale yellow on colour, sometimes with a purple centre, and occasionally  entirely purple. The staminal tube bears the anthers and is 1.5 to 2 cm in length. It is ovoid or oblong in shape and glabrous (i.e. hairless). The surface is pitted and a beak is present at the terminal end. The seeds within are globular and are covered in long white cotton.

Gossypium arboreum var. neglecta, locally known as "Phuti karpas", was the variant used to make Dhaka muslin in East India, now Bangladesh. The variant could only be grown in an area south of Dhaka, along the banks of the Meghna River. It could be spun so that individual threads could maintain tensile strength at counts higher than any other variant of cotton.

References

External links
 
 Public domain photo (copyright expired) of Gossypium arboreum (flickr.com)

Cotton
arboreum
Crops originating from India
Crops originating from Pakistan
Fiber plants
Plants described in 1753
Taxa named by Carl Linnaeus